Saen Sor Ploenchit (born May 18, 1971) is a Thai former professional boxer who competed from 1990 to 2003. He held the WBA flyweight title from 1994 to 1996.

Early life
Sor Ploenchit was born as  Somchai Chertchai (สมชาย เชิดฉาย; nickname: Neng; เหน่ง) in Amphoe Thanyaburi, Pathum Thani province.  Because of his poverty, he became a boxer since childhood, beginning from Muay Thai in the names "Superneng Loh-ngoen" (ซุปเปอร์เหน่ง โล่ห์เงิน) and "Doennna Loh-ngoen" (เดินหน้า โล่ห์เงิน). Before turning to the professional boxing in 1990 under Songchai Rattanasuban stable.

Boxing career
On February 13, 1994 he beat David Griman in Chachoengsao province, got the world champion title, and defended his title several times by facing a famous boxers such as Jesús "Kiki" Rojas, Aquiles Guzmán, Kim Yong-kang, Danny "Bazooka" Núñez. The most imposing defense was on October 17, 1995 when he TKO Hiroki Ioka in the 10th round at Osaka Prefectural Gymnasium, Osaka, Japan. After the bout, King Bhumibol Adulyadej also sent a royal congratulatory letter to him and his team through the Thai Consulate in Osaka.

In 1996, he defended three more times before losing in the end of the same year unexpectedly, when he lost unanimously scores against José Bonilla, a Venezuelan contender, which falls on a Loy Kratong day.

He later changed his manager to Wirat Wachirarattanawong and promoted to super-flyweight, by the hope of returning to the world champion again. But after many fights, it never happened, so retired implicitly.

His final fight he lost by TKO in the 6th round with Joichiro Tatsuyoshi, a Japanese former two-times WBC Bantamweight world champion in late 2002 at Osaka Prefectural Gymnasium, Osaka, Japan.

Boxing style
Sor Ploenchit is a boxer style. Although he lacked the explosive power and heavy hands but was a very skilled fighter, with a lovely crisp jab and good agility. His style was similar to the first Thai world champion, Pone Kingpetch. He was very popular from Thai boxing fans in that period, hence earned the alias "Pone II".

Retirement
After retirement, Sor Ploenchit's life was very difficult, the gold necklaces that was acquired during the glory days of life, found that they are actually more than half of the fake.

See also 
 List of flyweight boxing champions

References

External links 
 

1972 births
Living people
Super-flyweight boxers
Flyweight boxers
World flyweight boxing champions
World Boxing Association champions
Saen Sor Ploenchit
Saen Sor Ploenchit